Christopher Mitchum (born October 16, 1943) is an American film actor, screenwriter, and businessman. He was born in Los Angeles, California, the second son of film star Robert Mitchum and Dorothy Mitchum. He is the younger brother of actor James Mitchum.

Film career

Mitchum appeared in more than 60 films in 14 countries. He appeared with John Wayne in the motion pictures Chisum (1970), Rio Lobo (1970), and Big Jake (1971). He was cited by Box Office magazine as one of the top five stars of the future and the recipient of Photoplay's Gold Medal Award for 1972. He won both The Golden Horse Award (1981) and The Golden Reel, Best Actor award (1988, Indonesia). He has been a member of the Academy of Motion Picture Arts and Sciences since 1978. He was the Screen Actors Guild national first vice president, in 1987–89 and a member of the SAG board of directors, in 1983–89.

Personal life
Mitchum married Cynthia "Cindy" Davis in 1964. Together, they had children Bentley, Carrie, Jennifer, and Kian before divorcing in 1996. For four years in the 1990s, Mitchum was father-in-law to Carrie's husband, Casper Van Dien. Mitchum is the grandfather of Cappy Van Dien, Grace Van Dien, Allexanne Mitchum, Carrington Mitchum, and Wyatt Mitchum Cardone.

Mitchum has resided in the Santa Barbara, California area (Central Coast) since 1984. He ran unsuccessfully for the California State Assembly in 1998 and the U.S. House of Representatives, 24th Congressional District, in 2012 and 2014.

Filmography

Young Billy Young (1969) (uncredited)
The Good Guys and the Bad Guys (1969) as Minor Role (uncredited)
Chisum (1970) as Tom O'Folliard
Bigfoot (1970) as Rick
Suppose They Gave a War and Nobody Came (1970) as Alturi
Rio Lobo (1970) as Sgt. Tuscarora Phillips
Cactus in the Snow (1971) as George
Big Jake (1971) as Michael McCandles
H-Bomb (1971) as Eddie Fulmer / Reddy
Summertime Killer (1972) as Ray Castor
A Time for Love (1973, TV Movie) as Mark
Murder in a Blue World (1973) as David
Ricco the Mean Machine (1973) as Ricco
Once (1974) as Creation
Cosa Nostra Asia (1974)
Master Samurai (1974,  "The Agency") as James Peterson
Bloody Sun (1974,  "Blue Jeans & Dynamite")
Chinese Commandos (1975, Was Never Finished / Made) 
The Last Hard Men (1976) as Hal Brickman
Flight to Holocaust (1977, TV Movie) as Mark Gates
Stingray (1978) as Al
One Man Jury (1978) as Sgt. Blake
The Day Time Ended (1979) as Richard
Tusk (1980) as Richard Cairn
A Rumor of War (1980, TV Mini-Series) as Capt. Peterson
Desperate Target (1980,  "Escape from Russia")
The One Armed Executioner (1981)
Ritoru Champion (1981,  "My Champion") as Mike Gorman
Commander Firefox (1983)
Magnum P.I. (1984, TV Series) as Eric DeForrest
The Executioner, Part II (1984) as Lieutenant Roger O'Malley
 (1984,  "Hijacked to Hell") as Mr. Gull
Rocky IV (1985) as Russian Guard (uncredited)
Promises to Keep (1985, TV Movie) as Tom Palmer
The Serpent Warriors (1985) as Dr. Tim Muffett
American Commandos (1986) as Dean Mitchell
Final Score (1986) as Richard Brown
Angel of Death (1987,  "Commando Mengele") as Wolfgang von Backey
Faceless (1987), ( "Les Predateurs de la Nuit") as Morgan
SFX Retaliator (1987) as Steve Baker
Death Feud (1987,  "Savage Harbor") as Bill
Columbian Connection (1988,  "Dark Mission: Flowers of Evil) as Derek Carpenter
Leathernecks (1989)
We Are Seven (1989–1991, TV Series) as Tommy Morgan
American Hunter (1990,  "Lethal Hunter") as Jake Carver
Gummibärchen küßt man nicht (1989) as Johannes / Josef Thalberg
Aftershock (1990) as Col. Slater
Magic Kid (1993) as Dad
Tombstone (1993) as Ranch Hand
Jungle of Fear (1993)
Biohazard: The Alien Force (1995) as Donald Brady
Body Count (1995) as Captain Langston
Lethal Cowboy (1995) as Maffia-hoodlum
Striking Point (1995) as Col. Ivan Romanov
 Bad Boys (1995) as Sergeant Copperfield
Fugitive X: Innocent Target (1996, TV Movie) as Nick
Countdown to Disaster (1996,  "Lethal Orbit", TV Movie) as Gunter
Jimi (1996) as Chris Chandler
Lethal Seduction (1997) as Trent Jacobson
Motorcycle Cheerleading Mommas (1997) as Himself
Diamondbacks (1998) as Bill Jones
Love and War II: The Final Showdown (1998)
Lycanthrope (1999) as Jake Sutter
Night of Terror (1999)
Soul Searchers (2006) as Sheriff Traft
The Ritual (2009) as Sheriff Traft
Goy (2011, never finished) as Harald Rosenberg
Santa's Summer House (2012) as Pop

State and federal office candidacies
Mitchum has run once for the California State Assembly (35th District), and twice for the U.S. House of Representatives (California's 24th District). Since January 1, 2011, under California law, candidates are voter-nominated for state and federal offices; political parties cannot nominate candidates for office.

California Assembly 
In 1998, Mitchum was the Republican nominee in the general election for the California State Assembly in the 35th district, which included portions of Santa Barbara and Ventura Counties, where he served on the Republican Central Committee (1998–2000). His opponents were Democrat Hannah-Beth Jackson and Natural Law Party candidate Eric Dahl. Mitchum came in second behind Jackson with 44.5 percent of the vote to Jackson's 53 percent.

U.S. Congress 

In 2012, Mitchum ran for the U.S. House of Representatives as a Republican candidate in California's 24th district (San Luis Obispo, Santa Barbara, and part of Ventura counties), challenging incumbent Democratic Congresswoman Lois Capps. In the June 5, 2012 primary, he came in third, behind Republican Abel Maldonado and Capps, and ahead of Independent candidate Matt Boutté.

In 2014, Mitchum ran again for the U.S. congressional seat held by Representative Capps. He won the June 3, 2014, primary (running alongside four other Republicans, two additional Democrats, and an Independent candidate), coming in second behind Capps with 15.8 percent of the vote, and narrowly defeating Republican Justin Fareed by slightly over 600 votes. In the November 4 general election, Mitchum received 48.1 percent of the vote to Capps's 51.9 percent, in the closest race of Capps's entire congressional career.

Despite the close margin by which Mitchum lost to Capps, as well as the announcement that Capps would retire in 2016, Mitchum ultimately declined a third run for the same seat again, and instead endorsed Assemblyman Katcho Achadjian for the race to succeed Capps.

Election statistics

Philanthropic positions
Mitchum has served on several organizations'boards of directors and has been a fundraiser for a number of charities.
 Hollywood Benefit Horse Show, advisory board, 1996–present
 ZONA SECA, Board of Director, 2011–present
 Community Outreach for Prevention and Education chairman and honorary chairman, 1998–present
 Liberty Program—gang-member rehabilitation program—board member, Santa Barbara, 1999–2001
 Criminal Advisory Board for Fighting Back, Santa Barbara, 1999–2004
 Public Policy Advisory Board for Fighting Back, Santa Barbara, 1999–2004
 Board of directors, Police Activities League, Santa Barbara, 1999–2001
 Juvenile Justice & Delinquency Prevention Commission, chairman, for the governor's Office, State of California, OCJP January 1999
 Autistic Treatment Center "Roundup of Autism": Honorary Advisory Council: 1994–2002
 North American Riding for the Handicapped Association Advisory Board: 1992–96
 Santa Barbara International Film Festival: Honorary Board 1988–92
 Santa Barbara International Film Festival, board of directors: one-year term, 1987 
 Santa Barbara Civic Light Opera: founding chairman of the "Star Circle" fund-raiser, 1989

References

External links
Chris Mitchum For Congress (archived link)
Politicit.com: Chris Mitchum Profile

Interview with Chris Mitchum, March 14, 2015, Belleville News-Democrat

1943 births
Living people
California Republicans
American actor-politicians
American male film actors
American people of Norwegian descent
Male actors from Los Angeles
University of Pennsylvania alumni
Mitchum family